Asineops (Greek for "donkey-faced") is a genus of prehistoric fish from the Eocene. It was described by Edward Drinker Cope in 1870.

References
Asineops, Paleobiology Database

Acanthomorpha
Eocene fish
Eocene fish of North America